Frederick Delmont Tootell (September 9, 1902 – September 29, 1964) was an American athlete who competed mainly in the hammer throw.  He competed for the United States in the 1924 Summer Olympics held in Paris in the hammer throw where he won the gold medal. While participating the Olympics, Tootell was affiliated with the Boston Athletic Association. 

Tootell was born in Lawrence, Massachusetts and died in Wakefield, Rhode Island. Tootell graduated from Bowdoin College in 1923, where he played American football as a tackle and competed as a hammer thrower, and enrolled at Tufts University School of Medicine to maintain his eligibility for the 1924 Olympics.  After Irish-born athletes had won the gold in the hammer throw for the United States for five straight Olympics, Tootell became the first American-born athlete to do so.  

Beginning in 1925, he began a 39-year-long affiliation with the University of Rhode Island. He was professor of physical education, and coached the tennis, track, and cross country teams. Between 1953 and 1962, Tootell served as the university's athletic director. The school's Tootell Physical Education Center was named for him, and his home, the Tootell House, in Kingston, Rhode Island is on the National Register of Historic Places. Tootell was posthumously elected to the Rhode Island Heritage Hall of Fame in 1968.

He married Anne Parsons in 1926. After they divorced in 1935, Tootell married Lucy Rawlings Tootell.

References

1902 births
1964 deaths
People from South Kingstown, Rhode Island
Sportspeople from Lawrence, Massachusetts
Track and field athletes from Massachusetts
Track and field athletes from Rhode Island
American track and field coaches
American male hammer throwers
Male weight throwers
Olympic gold medalists for the United States in track and field
Athletes (track and field) at the 1924 Summer Olympics
Medalists at the 1924 Summer Olympics
College men's track and field athletes in the United States
College track and field coaches in the United States
Bowdoin Polar Bears football players
Rhode Island Rams athletic directors
Rhode Island Rams men's basketball coaches
Bowdoin Polar Bears men's track and field athletes
College tennis coaches in the United States
College cross country coaches in the United States
University of Rhode Island faculty